Dhawankhan Jagir  is a village in Kapurthala district of Punjab State, India. The village is administrated by a Sarpanch, who is an elected representative.

Demography 
According to the 2011 Census of India, Dhawankhan Jagir then had a total number of 129 houses and population of 594  of which include 310 males and 284 females. Literacy rate of Dhawankhan Jagir was 72.47%, lower than state average of 75.84%.  The population of children under the age of 6 years was 71 which was 11.95% of total population of Dhawankhan Jagir, and child sex ratio was approximately  690, lower than the state average of 846.

Air travel connectivity 
The closest airport to the village is Sri Guru Ram Dass Jee International Airport.

Villages in Kapurthala

External links
  Villages in Kapurthala
 Kapurthala Villages List

References

Villages in Kapurthala district